Stratton Oakmont, Inc. was a Long Island, New York, "over-the-counter" brokerage house founded in 1989 by Jordan Belfort and Danny Porush. It defrauded many shareholders, leading to the arrest and incarceration of several executives and the closing of the firm in 1996.

Section 230 of the Communications Decency Act was created in response to Stratton Oakmont, Inc. v. Prodigy Services Co..

History
Jordan Belfort founded Stratton Oakmont in 1989 with Danny Porush and Brian Blake. Earlier, Belfort opened a franchise of Stratton Securities, a minor league broker-dealer, and then bought out the entire firm. Stratton Oakmont became the largest over-the-counter firm in the United States during the late 1980s and 1990s, responsible for the initial public offering of 35 companies, including Steve Madden Ltd. The firm had no product control function to verify prices of its positions and monitor trading activity.

Stratton Oakmont participated in pump-and-dump schemes, a form of microcap stock fraud that involves artificially inflating the price of an owned stock through false and misleading positive statements to sell the cheaply purchased stock at a higher price. Once the operators of the scheme "dump" their overvalued shares, the price falls and investors lose their money. Stratton Oakmont also tried to maintain stock prices by refusing to accept or process orders to sell stock. In 1995, the firm sued Prodigy Services Co. for libel in a New York court, in a case that had wide legal implications.

The firm was under near-constant scrutiny from the National Association of Securities Dealers (NASD) from 1989 onward. Finally, in April 1996, the New York District Business Conduct Committee barred Stratton Oakmont from conducting principal retail transactions for a year. Stratton Oakmont appealed to the NASD National Business Conduct Committee. In December, the NBCC expelled Stratton Oakmont from the NASD, putting the firm out of business. Officials called Stratton Oakmont "one of the worst actors" in the securities industry, with a history of "obvious disregard for all rules of fair practice".

In 1999, Belfort and Porush were indicted for securities fraud and money laundering. They pleaded guilty and admitted that for seven years they operated a scheme in which they manipulated the stock of at least 34 companies. As part of their plea deal, they received less prison time, and cooperated with prosecutors in their investigations of other brokerage houses.

In popular culture
The 2013 film The Wolf of Wall Street is a drama based on Belfort's memoirs, directed by Martin Scorsese. Leonardo DiCaprio stars as Belfort and Jonah Hill plays Donnie Azoff, a fictional character loosely based on Danny Porush.

The film presents Belfort's selection of "Stratton Oakmont" as the name for his company as a psychological trick: by using a seemingly respectable and supposedly historic name they could lure investors by appearing to be a professional, old brokerage firm. As Belfort says in the film, in a scene where he explains to his new employees the company's name change from "The Investor Center": "we're a new company and a new name. A company that our clients can believe in, a company that our clients can trust. A company whose roots are so deeply embedded into Wall Street that our very founders sailed over on the Mayflower and chiseled the name 'Stratton Oakmont' right into Plymouth Rock."

See also
 Microcap stock fraud
 Stock manipulation

References

Companies based in New York (state)
Wall Street
Finance fraud
Brokerage firms
Pump and dump schemes